Kingston (1884–1912) was an American Thoroughbred racehorse. He won 89 races, the most in the history of the sport of thoroughbred racing. Of his 138 starts, he was out of the money only on four occasions. He was later inducted into the United States Racing Hall of Fame.

Background
He was bred by James R. Keene at his Castleton Stud near Lexington, Kentucky. Kingston was by Spendthrift out of Kapanga (GB) by Victorious, 2nd dam Kapunda, by Stockwell. Kingston's line goes back through Spendthrift to three significant sires: Lexington, Glencoe, and Boston.

Keene only sold him because he was having financial difficulties.  As a yearling, Kingston was purchased by the trainer, Evert Snedecker, and his partner J. F. Cushman.  They raced him as a two-year-old, during which time he proved himself a colt of quality, though he was beaten by both Hanover and the noted Tremont.

As a three-year-old, Kingston was bought by two Brooklyn ex-butchers, Phil and Mike Dwyer for $12,500.  The Dwyer Brothers typically bought horses rather than breeding them, their chosen strategy for building a successful stable. They hoped that owning both Kingston and Hanover would prevent Hanover from racing a horse which might defeat him.

Racing record
Once under the Dwyer's roof, Kingston's conditioning was taken over by future Hall of Fame member Frank McCabe. The colt then went on a streak of success.  At three, he won 13 of his 18 starts.  At four, he won 10 of 14.  At five, he won 14 times from 15 starts.  At six, he won 9 of 10 of his ten starts.  At seven, he started 21 times and won 15.  When he was seven he also set a time record at the old Futurity course at Sheepshead Bay of 1:08 for six furlongs.  At the age of eight, he won 13 of his 20 races.  At nine, 9 out of 25, but in most of these 25 races he took home money.  In his last year of racing, when he was 10 years old, he won four of his nine starts against much younger horses.

As an entire Kingston still raced way past the age when intact horses are retired to stud.  Many experts believe a stallion sours if he’s raced too long, but Kingston was as good a sire as he was a race horse.

Stud record
Two years after he went to stud Kingston was already a leading sire.  He led the American sire list in 1900 and 1910.

Kingston's progeny included: Ely (Gold Cup Stakes), Ildrim (Belmont Stakes), Novelty (Belmont Futurity Stakes etc.) and King's Courier (Doncaster Cup).

He died in Kentucky on December 6, 1912.

Following the creation of the National Museum of Racing and Hall of Fame in 1955, Kingston was one of the first group of horses inducted.

Pedigree

An asterisk before a horse's name means they were imported into North America.

Kingston is inbred to Melbourne 4S × 4D, meaning Melbourne appears in the fourth generation on both the sire and dam's side of the pedigree.

See also
List of leading Thoroughbred racehorses
List of historical horses

References

 Kingston’s page in the Hall of Fame

External links
 Kingston’s pedigree

1884 racehorse births
1912 racehorse deaths
American Champion racehorses
Racehorses trained in the United States
Horse racing track record setters
Racehorses bred in Kentucky
United States Thoroughbred Racing Hall of Fame inductees
United States Champion Thoroughbred Sires
Godolphin Arabian sire line
Thoroughbred family 13